Daniel Danielis (Visé near Liège 1635- Vannes 1696) was a Belgian composer. He studied at Maastricht and was organist at Saint Lambert's Church. Between 1661 and 1681 he served as Kapellmeister at the court of Mecklenburg-Güstrow. In 1684 he became maître de musique at Vannes Cathedral.

Works, editions and recordings
Surviving works include 72 petits motets, several of them preserved by composer and collector Sébastien de Brossard, another 12 in a collection by Philidor. 54 of these motets are for 1 or 2 voices. A full catalogue of his works was published by Catherine Cessac, of the CMBV, in 2003.

Recordings
 Motets for one or two voices - including Caelo rores. Adjuro vos. Cognoscam. O Dulcissime. Jesu dulcissime. Quid reminiscimini Adoro te meo salus. Dic mihi o bone Jesu. Jesu mi. O alme vindex criminum. Mellon, Collot, Terakado, Malgoire, Uemura. dir. Christophe Rousset 1993 (Koch Schwann 3–1031)
 Motets d’Uppsala - 11 motets, including Paratum cor meum. Inter flammas amoris. Françoise Masset, Stephanie Revidat, Jean-François Novelli, Jérôme Corréas. Rousset 1997 (Cypres Records)
 Caeleste convivium - motets including Propter nimiam charitatem. Ornate aras. O bonitas, o amor!  Ad arma fideles. Obstupescite omnes. O ! o salutaris hostia!. Ad fontes amoris. Venite ed videte. Super flumina Babylonis. Ad gaudia cœli. Quo tendimus mortales. Ensemble Pierre Robert, Frédéric Desenclos. Alpha 2008

References

1635 births
1696 deaths
People from Visé
Belgian Baroque composers
Belgian classical composers
Belgian male classical composers
Belgian organists
Male organists
17th-century classical composers
17th-century male musicians